"" ("Oh God, look down from heaven") is a Lutheran chorale of 1524, with words written by Martin Luther paraphrasing Psalm 12. It was published as one of eight songs in 1524 in the first Lutheran hymnal, the Achtliederbuch, which contained four songs by Luther, three by Speratus, and one by Justus Jonas. It was contained in 1524 in the Erfurt Enchiridion. It is part of many hymnals, also in translations. The text inspired vocal and organ music by composers such as Heinrich Schütz, who set it as part of his Becker Psalter, and Johann Sebastian Bach, who based a chorale cantata on it. Mozart used one of its tunes in his opera The Magic Flute.

History and text

At the end of 1523, Luther paraphrased Psalm 12 (Psalm 11 in Vulgata numbering), in Latin , attempting to make the psalms accessible to Protestant church services in German. Luther's poetry first follows the verses of the psalm exactly, then combines two verses to one. He expands the content of the psalm to show the precise situation of the early Reformation as a time of conflict.

It was one of eight hymns of the first Lutheran hymnal, published 1524 in Nuremberg under the title  (Some Christian songs), also called Achtliederbuch. The same year it appeared in Erfurt in Eyn Enchiridion. The hymn was soon used as a Protestant Kampflied (battle song).

The chorale became the Lutheran  (main hymn) for the second Sunday after Trinity.

Melody
In the first Lutheran hymnal the melody was the same as for "" by Paul Speratus (Zahn No. 4430). In the Erfurt Enchiridion, also in 1524, the text first appeared with a tune codified by Martin Luther, Zahn No. 4431, which was derived from the secular song "Begierlich in dem Herzen mein" (The lustful desires in my heart) from about 1410. This melody is in Phrygian mode, preferred by Luther for texts of repentance, such as "". In Johann Walter's hymnal , published in Wittenberg in 1524, it appeared with a different melody (Zahn No. 4432a).

Musical settings
The Zahn No. 4431 melody was set by composers for instruments like harpsichord and organ, and for voices.

Instrumental

Jan Pieterszoon Sweelinck composed a piece for harpsichord, elaborating on the tune. Johann Pachelbel composed two chorale preludes for organ as part of  before 1693.

Vocal
Heinrich Schütz set the chorale as part of the Becker Psalter. Wilhelm Friedemann Bach set the chorale as a church cantata (Fk 96). Felix Mendelssohn composed in 1832 a chorale cantata for baritone, mixed choir and orchestra (MWV A13).

Mozart used the melody in his opera Die Zauberflöte in act 2, Finale, scene 10, when the two "" (men in armour) recite it in unison on Schikaneder's words "" as a cantus firmus of a Baroque-style chorale prelude. Alfred Einstein comments in his biography Mozart / His Character, His Work:In the second act it is the final test of the lovers, the "'test of fire and water", for which Mozart called into play every musical means at his disposal and for which he ordained extreme simplicity, extreme mastery; the scene of the men in armor, which he constructed in the form of a chorale prelude, building upon a solemn fugato around the chorale Ach Gott, vom Himmel sieh darein ...

References

External links

 O Lord, look down from heaven CyberHymnal 2011
 Look Down, O Lord, From Heaven Behold (also known as O God, from Heaven Look Down or O God, Look Down from Heaven and See) openhymnal.org 2009
 BWV 2.6 bach-chorales.com

16th century in music
Lutheran hymns based on Psalms
Hymn tunes
Hymns by Martin Luther
16th-century hymns in German